The tunica albuginea is the fibrous envelope that extends the length of the corpora cavernosa penis and corpus spongiosum penis. It is a bi-layered structure that includes an outer longitudinal layer and an inner circular layer.

Anatomy

Microstructure 
The trabeculae of the tunica albuginea are more delicate, nearly uniform in size, and the meshes between them smaller than in the corpora cavernosa penis: their long diameters, for the most part, corresponding with that of the penis.

The external envelope or outer coat of the corpus spongiosum is formed partly of unstriped muscular fibers, and a layer of the same tissue immediately surrounds the canal of the urethra.

It consists of approximately 5% elastin, with the remainder mostly consisting of collagen.

Function 
The tunica albuginea is directly involved in maintaining an erection; that is due to Buck's fascia constricting the erection veins of the penis, preventing blood from leaving and thus sustaining the erect state.

Additional images

References

External links
  - "The Male Perineum and the Penis: The Corpus Spongiosum and Corpora Cavernosa"
 Image at downstate.edu
 Image at downstate.edu
 
 Encyclopedia of Reproduction

Mammal male reproductive system
Human penis anatomy